Aijaz Ali Shah Sheerazi was a Pakistani politician who had been a Member of the Provincial Assembly of Sindh, from May 2013 to May 2018.

Political career

He was elected to the Provincial Assembly of Sindh as an independent candidate from Constituency PS-84 Thatta-I in 2013 Pakistani general election.

In 2018, He was appointed as Advisor to Chief Minister of Sindh on Social Welfare department.

Death

He died from COVID-19 on 10 December 2020.

References

Living people
Sindh MPAs 2013–2018
Pakistan Muslim League (N) politicians
Year of birth missing (living people)